The women's eight competition at the 2022 World Rowing Championships took place at the Račice regatta venue.

Schedule
The schedule was as follows:

All times are Central European Summer Time (UTC+2)

Results

Preliminary race
All boats advanced directly to Final A.

Final A
The final determined the rankings

References

2022 World Rowing Championships